Marcos Chaib Mion (born June 20, 1979 in São Paulo) is a Brazilian TV host, actor, voice actor, author and businessman (Partner of V.Rom). Mion studied Philosophy at Universidade de São Paulo, and later graduated in Communication and Body Arts at Pontifícia Universidade Católica de São Paulo.

Career 

He started his career on TV as an actor in 1999, on the Rede Globo's show Sandy e Júnior. In 2000, he went to work on MTV Brasil, hosting the shows Supernova and Piores Clipes do Mundo (Worst Videos in the World, in Portuguese). With the success of the latter, Mion was hired by Rede Bandeirantes in 2002, where he hosted the show Descontrole, known for a lot of live improvisation.

He later returned to MTV Brasil, hosting the shows Covernation, The Nadas, Mucho Macho, Descarga MTV, and Quinta Categoria.

In 2006, he portrayed Emílio Redenção in Rede Record's telenovela Bicho do Mato. Later, in 2010, his work with the network continued as he started to host his own show Legendários, which as of December 2016 is still ongoing. Also, he is a blogger of R7.

Through the years, he has also had acting roles in plays, appearances in film, and has also served as director for music videos.

In 2021, Mion joined Globo; in September 2021, Mion would succeed Luciano Huck as host of its Saturday variety show Caldeirão. Mion was intended to serve as an interim host for the program until March 2022. However, in October 2021, after his tenure resulted in a positive response and viewership gains, Mion was made the full-time host. Mion has also contributed to music festival coverage for sister network Multishow, including Rock in Rio and Lollapalooza Brasil.

Personal life 
In 1994, his older brother, Marcelo, died after an accident at the São Paulo Museum of Art, in which he fell in the ground-level plaza under the building's sizeable free span. This event lead Mion to a deep depression and drug addiction.

Mion married to Suzana Gullo in 2005. They have three children: Romeo (age 11), Donatella (age 7), and Stefano (age 5).

Mion is an advocate for his autistic son, Romeo. In 2016, Mion wrote a Christmas book about his son. Later, in 2019, Mion published an English social media message, with a translation in the caption: "Autism is not a disease, do not try to 'cure us', try to understand us."

Mion is a Roman Catholic.

Awards and nominations

References

1982 births
Brazilian television personalities
Brazilian television presenters
Living people
People from São Paulo
Brazilian Roman Catholics
Autism activists